Marek Loskot (born July 25, 1989) is a Czech professional ice hockey player. He played with BK Mladá Boleslav in the Czech Extraliga during the 2010–11 Czech Extraliga season. From 2016 to 2018 he played on the french team Rethel.

References

External links

1989 births
Living people
BK Mladá Boleslav players
Czech ice hockey forwards
People from Černošice
Sportspeople from the Central Bohemian Region
Competitors at the 2017 World Games
Competitors at the 2022 World Games
World Games gold medalists
World Games silver medalists
HC '05 Banská Bystrica players
HC Slovan Ústečtí Lvi players
AZ Havířov players
HC Benátky nad Jizerou players
HC Stadion Litoměřice players
Czech expatriate ice hockey players in Slovakia